Matti Launonen (31 May 1944 – 23 March 2019) was a Finnish para table tennis player who competed until his sudden death in 2019. He was one of the first table tennis players to win a world title in the para table tennis championships in Assen, Netherlands and a European title in Salou, Spain.

Launonen was seriously injured aged 18 in a car accident while travelling at more than 80 km/h, the car he was driving had handbrake fault and he couldn't stop the car: the car suddenly turned and rolled around.

He had a fall at his home and suffered a leg injury but died at hospital aged 74 in Florida.

References

2019 deaths
Paralympic table tennis players of Finland
Medalists at the 1992 Summer Paralympics
Medalists at the 1996 Summer Paralympics
Medalists at the 2000 Summer Paralympics
Table tennis players at the 1992 Summer Paralympics
Table tennis players at the 1996 Summer Paralympics
Table tennis players at the 2000 Summer Paralympics
Table tennis players at the 2004 Summer Paralympics
1944 births
Finnish expatriates in the United States
Paralympic bronze medalists for Finland
Paralympic gold medalists for Finland
Paralympic silver medalists for Finland
People from Kuopio
Paralympic medalists in table tennis
Sportspeople from North Savo
Finnish table tennis players